Hamner House may refer to:

Hamner House (Bon Secour, Alabama), listed on the National Register of Historic Places in Baldwin County, Alabama
Hamner House (Schuyler, Virginia), nominated for listing on the National Register of Historic Places in Nelson County, Virginia